Bhagwan Das Garga, also known as B. D. Garga (14 November 1924 in Lehragaga, Punjab - 18 July 2011 in Patiala, Punjab), was an Indian documentary filmmaker and film historian.

Bhagwan Das Garga was born on 14 November 1924. He was enrolled to study for a medical career, but this pursuit was interrupted by the occasion of the Quit India Movement in 1942. He decided, around 1943, at the behest of K.A. Abbas, to devote himself to a career in the arts. This is also when he wrote his first piece as a writer on film for Abbas’ publication, Sargam. He then studied Cinematography at St. Xavier’s College, Bombay (Mumbai), later working under noted Indian film director and auteur, V. Shantaram. He started his career as a documentary filmmaker with Storm Over Kashmir (1948), before participating in a diverse set of filmic projects and settings across Europe. He also contributed as Asst. Director to Abbas’ Indo-Soviet co-production film, Pardesi (1957) at Mosfilm Studios in Moscow. Upon his return to India, he helped found the National Film Archive of India (NFAI) in 1964. He was also a frequent visiting lecturer at the then-newly founded Film and Television Institute of India (FTII), along with being a member at the Film Advisory Board.

He wrote and contributed to various leading cinema journals across India (Montage, Cinevision, Madhyam) and abroad (the most prominent of these, Cahiers du Cinéma, Revue du Cinema and Sight & Sound – for each of which, he acted as a Correspondent). He also participated extensively in the effort to compile Encyclopaedia Americana and also, the encyclopedia of Soviet Film.  Around this time, he availed of an opportunity to conduct extensive research on Indian cinema in order to produce a film anthology to commemorate its golden jubilee, 50 Years of Indian Cinema (1963).

In 1967, he was appointed one of the experts on the UNESCO Committee of the History of World Cinema. This led then to the legendary 1969 exhibition – the first of its kind in Cinematheque Francaise – where he helped Henri Langlois organize a retrospective of the history of Indian cinema. In latter years, he preserved correspondence with Langlois and inherited from him a set of principles regarding the preservation of film that came ultimately to define his work. In subsequent years, Garga was invited by UNESCO to attend roundtable conferences on cinema and television in such venues and festivals as Mannheim, Venice, Beirut, Budapest, Montreal and Locarno. Garga preserved simultaneously a career as an active filmmaker in these years. In 1992, he shifted to Goa with Donnabelle (about whom, noted critic, journalist and the founder-editor of Biblio wrote, ' In his endeavours he has hugely benefited from the energy, drive and application of his wife Donnabelle. It is she who ensures that his passionate engagement with the Seventh Art does not ebb.'), his collaborator and wife, to embark on a career as a writer.

This resulted in the seminal, 1996 compilation, So Many Cinemas, which in its title and through its general scale, identifies the history of cinema in India as a plural, multi-tentacled, giant organism. This was followed by 2005’s Art of Cinema, a compilation of his writings that this present archive most closely resembles, and 2007’s From Raj to Swaraj: The History of Documentary Film in India, which won the National Film Award for Best Book on Cinema. He repeated this feat with 2011’s Silent Cinema in India: A Pictorial Journey.

B.D. Garga passed away on 18 July 2011 in Patiala, Punjab.

The sequel to Silent Cinema in India, a book entitled, The Sunshine Years, about the history of the talkies and studio system in the country, is a work-in- progress.

Garga’s seven-decade long career resulted in close to fifty documentary films (an annotated list will be available on the website), a substantial body of work as a critic, close to five books on cinema, collaborations with noted national and international figures in film and culture, several national and international awards, and recognition, by a community of peers that includes such figures as Kevin Brownlow, as a figure whose work is especially relevant to film history.

Life 

Garga grew up in Lahore and developed an interest in photography as a teenager. He published some of his photographs in the magazine Illustrated Weekly of India. In 1943, he went to Mumbai and worked in the Indian film industry for the director V. Shantaram, where he learned the film craft. There he met the journalist and film critic K. A. Abbas, who encouraged him to write an article on the history of Indian cinema for Abbas' original magazine Sargam.

In 1948, Garga shot his first of more than 50 documentaries, which he also wrote and produced. His cinematic interest led him to Europe in 1953, where he studied film-making at the Ealing Studios and established contacts with the British Film Institute and the Cinémathèque française. Henri Langlois was a lifelong friend of his, and after Langlois's death in 1977 he wrote the obituary in the magazine Filmfare, in which he praised him as the greatest promoter of world cinema. During his five-year period in Europe, Garga also traveled to the Soviet Union and supported Abbas at the Mosfilm studios working on the Soviet-Soviet filming trip over three seas (1957). He also co-operated with film historians and archivists.

Garga's research and writing was about film; his research on Indian film history culminated in the first film anthology on the occasion of the 50th anniversary of Indian film. Garga was a member of the expert UNESCO committee on the history of international film. In 1969, he organized the first retrospective of Indian cinema with the Cinémathèque française. He was a member of the Film Advisory Board of India and a founding member of the National Film Archive of India in Pune. He also published essays on various aspects of Indian cinema, according to the NFDC magazine Cinema in India. The state Indian film promotion honored him for the 75th anniversary of Indian film in 1988 with a prize for his contribution to the growth of the national film industry. Garga was a jury member of national and international film festivals.

In 1992 Garga moved with his wife from Mumbai to Goa. At the Mumbai International Film Festival in 1996, he was awarded the V. Shantaram Award for his work in the documentary film. For his book From Raj to Swaraj: The Non-Fiction Film in India on the history of the Indian documentary, he received a National Film Award for the best Indian book on Film of the Year in 2007. Garga sold his unique private collection of about 3000 film memorabilia shortly before his death for 20 million rupees to the Indira Gandhi National Center for the Arts in New Delhi. His last book, Silent Cinema, in India: A Pictorial Journey was released in 2012 and was also awarded the National Film Award.

Bibliography 
 The Present-Day Situation and Future Prospects of the Feature Film in India, Paris: UNESCO, 1961
 Sound Track in the Indian Film, Paris: UNESCO, 1966
 So Many Cinemas: The Motion Picture in India, 1996
 The Art of Cinema: An Insider’s Journey Through Fifty Years of Film History, 2005
 From Raj to Swaraj: The Non-Fiction Film in India, 2007
 Silent Cinema in India: A Pictorial Journey, 2012

Filmography 
 1948: Storm over Kashmir
 1960: Family Planning – Why?
 1964: Creative Artists of India – Satyajit Ray
 1968: The Dance of Shiva (cowritten with Chidananda Dasgupta)
 1969: Creative Artists of India – Amrita Sher-Gil
 1975: Sarojini Naidu
 1978: It Is Indian, It Is Good
 1981: Bombay – A City at Stake
 1985: Writing Off the Raj
 Mamallapuram

References

External links 
 
 Filmografie
 Obituary B.D. Garga bei BFI
 CII honours veteran film historian B D Garga in Goa von 22 November 2007
 Bhagwan Garga, pioneering documentary film maker and film historian, is no longer with us.
 B. D. Garga: Indian Documentary in "Cinema in India", Vol. II, No. 2, April–June 1988, S. 32-36
 Garga Archives curated by Lightcube

Indian documentary filmmakers
Indian film critics
Indian film historians
Indian male journalists
Indian male writers
1924 births
2011 deaths
Writers from Punjab, India
People from Sangrur district
20th-century Indian film directors
Film directors from Punjab, India
20th-century Indian historians
Scholars from Punjab, India